Two-Fisted Stranger is a 1946 American Western film directed by Ray Nazarro and written by Robert Lee Johnson. The film stars Charles Starrett, Doris Houck, Zeke Clements and Smiley Burnette. The film was released on May 30, 1946, by Columbia Pictures.

Plot

Cast          
Charles Starrett as Steve Gordon / The Durango Kid
Doris Houck as Jennifer Martin
Zeke Clements as Zeke Clements
Smiley Burnette as Smiley Burnette
Charles Murray Jr. as Ted Randolph
Lane Chandler as Brady
Ted Mapes as Duke Benson
George Chesebro as Doyle
Jack Rockwell as Sheriff Condon
Herman Hack as Outlaw
Davison Clark as J. P. Martin
Maudie Prickett as Widow Simpson

References

External links
 

1946 films
1940s English-language films
American Western (genre) films
1946 Western (genre) films
Columbia Pictures films
Films directed by Ray Nazarro
American black-and-white films
1940s American films